Christine Burckle is a retired brigadier general  and retired Commander and Assistant Adjutant General - Air of the Utah Air National Guard.

In August 2016, Willis was the Utah Air National Guard's first woman to achieve the rank of brigadier general.

Early life and education
Burckle was born in Ohio and raised in Connecticut.

Burckle attended the University of North Carolina at Chapel Hill where she majored in mathematics.

Military service
In 1988, Burckle received a commission as a 2nd Lieutenant through the Reserve Officer Training Corps at the University of North Carolina at Chapel Hill. Burckle intended to become a fighter pilot. However, her vision disqualified her. In lieu, she chose navigation and requested bombers. At the time, the US Army did not allow women to serve on combat bomber aircraft. In 1990, she graduated first in her navigator training class at Mather Air Force Base.

She served over eight years on active duty in the US Air Force at Carswell Air Force Base in Texas and at Mountain Home Air Force Base in Idaho.

In 1996, she joined the Utah Air National Guard as a navigator for the KC-135 military aerial refueling aircraft, eventually logging more than 3000 hours in the aircraft. She deployed for operations Desert Storm, Desert Shield, Uphold Democracy, Joint Forge, Enduring Freedom, Allied Force and Operation Noble Eagle. At the Utah National Guard, she has served as the director of staff, the 151 Air Refueling Wing vice commander, comprising the 109th Air Control Squadron, the 130th Engineering Installation Squadron and the 151st Intelligence Surveillance Reconnaissance Group.

On August 6, 2016, Burckle assumed command of the Utah Air National Guard. She became the Utah Air National Guard’s highest-ranking official, as well as Utah’s first National Guard female general officer and the first woman to serve as Commander of the Utah Air National Guard. In this role, Burckle  became responsible for the command, control and operations of plans and programs of more than 1,400 personnel at Wright Air National Guard Base.

On August 29, 2019, Burckle retired from the US military after 31 years. During her retirement ceremony at Roland Wright Air National Guard Base in Salt Lake City, Utah, Burckle received the Legion of Merit, one of the highest peacetime U.S. military decorations.

References

Date of birth missing (living people)
Year of birth missing (living people)
Living people
National Guard (United States) generals
Utah National Guard personnel
Military personnel from Utah
University of North Carolina at Chapel Hill alumni